Chrysorthenches polita is a species of moth in the family Plutellidae. It was first described by Alfred Philpott in 1918. It is endemic to New Zealand and it has been observed in both the North and South Islands. This species likely has two broods a year with one emerging in late spring and other in summer. The larvae mine leaves of Podocarpus species including Podocarpus totara. Adults have been observed on the wing in July to October and December to March.

Taxonomy 
This species was first described by Alfred Philpott in 1918 using a specimen collected at Tisbury in Invercargill and named Orthenches polita. George Hudson discussed and illustrated this species in his 1928 book The butterflies and moths of New Zealand. In 1996 John S. Dugdale placed this species in the genus Chrysorthenches. The male holotype is held at the New Zealand Arthropod Collection.

Description 

Philpott described the male adult as follows:

This species is small with a brassy ground colour to its forewings and frequently has a grey head.

Distribution 
This species is endemic to New Zealand and has been observed in both the North and South Islands.

Behaviour
It has been hypothesised that this species has two broods a year with one developing over winter and emerging in late spring and the other emerging in summer. Adults have been observed on the wing in July to October and December to March.

Hosts

The larva of this species mine the leaves of species of Podocarpus including Podocarpus totara. As at 2020 the mines created by the larvae of this moth have not yet been described.

DNA analysis 
In 2020 this species along with the other species in the genus Chrysorthenches had their DNA and morphological characters studied.

References

Moths described in 1918
Plutellidae
Moths of New Zealand
Endemic fauna of New Zealand
Taxa named by Alfred Philpott
Endemic moths of New Zealand